Juraj Tarr (born 18 February 1979) is a Slovak flatwater sprint canoeist who competes in two-man (K-2) and four-man (K-4) events. He participated in four Olympics in the K-4 1000 m event and won silver medals in 2008 and 2016, placing fourth in 2000 and sixth in 2012. He also won eight medals at the ICF Canoe Sprint World Championships in 2005–2015, including four gold medals.

Tarr belongs to the Hungarian minority in Slovakia. He took up canoeing aged eight, following his father Juraj Tarr Sr., who competed internationally for Czechoslovakia. He was named Slovak Kayaker of the Year in 2014 (together with Erik Vlček) and in 2015. Earlier in 1997 he was diagnosed with thyroid cancer and semi-retired from sport for three years to undergo intensive treatment.

References

External links

 
 
 
 
 
 
 

1979 births
Canoeists at the 2000 Summer Olympics
Canoeists at the 2008 Summer Olympics
Canoeists at the 2012 Summer Olympics
Canoeists at the 2016 Summer Olympics
Living people
Olympic canoeists of Slovakia
Olympic silver medalists for Slovakia
Slovak male canoeists
Olympic medalists in canoeing
Hungarians in Slovakia
Sportspeople from Komárno
ICF Canoe Sprint World Championships medalists in kayak
Medalists at the 2008 Summer Olympics
Medalists at the 2012 Summer Olympics
Canoeists at the 2015 European Games
European Games competitors for Slovakia